The Beza Mahafaly Special Reserve is a nature reserve in Madagascar  northeast of Betioky Sud. The reserve also provides training and research opportunities. The reserve has a museum that is open to tourists.

Tree species featured in the two galleries include tamarind trees and Madagascar ocotillo, among many others. Animals residing in the galleries include four species of lemurs, four species of tenrecs, 17 species of saurians, 12 species of snakes, two species of tortoises and, in season, the Nile crocodile. There are over 100 species of birds.

History
The Reserve was founded in 1975, when community leaders formed a partnership with the University of Madagascar (now University of Antananarivo), Washington University in St. Louis, and Yale University aiming to protect the forest. It has been a centre for research and education since 1978, and the Bezà Mahafaly Monitoring Team of local researchers began work in 1995.

Research
International researchers, supported by the Monitoring Team, maintain long-term studies of the reserve's wildlife. For example, Verreaux's sifaka and the ring-tailed lemur have been the subjects of collaborative research by Malagasy and US researchers for over 25 years. During this period, hundreds of specimens have been observed in the field, with individual tagging, anatomical measurement, and genetic and hormone sampling helping researchers to understand their behavior, physiology, mating strategies, and demography.

In addition to collecting systematic data on climatic conditions, the Monitoring Team seeks to gather information about the human community living near the reserve: who they are, how they live, and what are their attitudes toward the reserve.

Education and training

Beza Mahafaly hosts an annual field school run by ESSA-Forêts, where 15-20 fifth-year students gain practical experience of conservation techniques in a 10-day course. The students undertake a combination of seminars, fieldwork, and independent projects. Field-based courses are offered to student groups from international institutions.

Other group workshops, outreach events, and training courses targeted at local school children, adults living in nearby, university students, teachers, and government officials take place each year.

See also
 List of national parks of Madagascar

References

External links

 Beza Mahafaly website
 University of Colorado Beza Mahafaly Lemur Biology Project
 Beza Mahafaly Program, Forestry Department at the School of Agronomy, University of Antananarivo

1978 establishments in Madagascar
Forests of Madagascar
Special reserves of Madagascar
Protected areas established in 1978
Madagascar spiny thickets
Madagascar succulent woodlands
Important Bird Areas of Madagascar